Allan Peachey (18 October 1949 – 6 November 2011) was a New Zealand politician and Member of Parliament for Tamaki.

School principal
Before his election to Parliament, Peachey was employed as the principal of Rangitoto College, the largest secondary school in New Zealand. He had previously been the president of the Secondary Principals Association of New Zealand, and was an outspoken commentator on educational issues. An example of such commentary is his book What's Up with Our Schools?, which was released in 2005.

Member of Parliament

Peachey was selected as a list candidate for the National Party in the 2002 elections, and was viewed by many as one of the party's brighter prospects. His ranking on the party's list (eighteenth, above several sitting MPs) was thought sufficient to guarantee him entry to Parliament, but the National Party's overall performance was poor enough that he narrowly missed out.

Peachey stood for election again in the 2005 elections. He was ranked at thirty on National's party list, but was also selected as the National candidate for Tamaki, traditionally regarded as a safe National seat. This selection caused a certain amount of controversy, as the seat already had a sitting National MP. That MP, Clem Simich, was persuaded to withdraw, and was rewarded with a high list placing and the National Party candidacy in the electorate of Mangere. Peachey won the Tamaki electorate seat, receiving 20,956 votes of a total 36,946. The immediate runner-up in his electorate was Leila Boyle, a Labour Party candidate who received 11,446 votes.

"Knife in Your Back" controversy
Controversy arose when Peachey e-mailed Selwyn College co-principal Carol White declining an invitation to the school's prizegiving stating at the bottom: "Yes, I do have a knife in your back, so be careful." Peachey quickly issued an apology.

Retirement and death
Although Peachey initially planned to seek re-election in the 2011 election, having been renominated for Tāmaki electorate and been ranked 48th on the party list, he subsequently announced his withdrawal "to focus on his treatment and recovery from his recent ill health". He had not previously disclosed the nature or extent of his ill health. His sudden withdrawal shortly before the elections forced the National Party to arrange a new candidate selection process.

References

External links
 Allan Peachey's official site.
 Parliamentary website

1949 births
2011 deaths
New Zealand National Party MPs
New Zealand educators
Deaths from cancer in New Zealand
Place of birth missing
Place of death missing
Members of the New Zealand House of Representatives
New Zealand MPs for Auckland electorates
Unsuccessful candidates in the 2002 New Zealand general election
21st-century New Zealand politicians
Heads of schools in New Zealand